Seemathurai is a 2018 Tamil film directed by Santhosh Thyagarajan in his film debut. The film stars Geethan Britto and Varsha Bollamma in the lead roles.

Cast 
 Geethan Britto as Marudhu
 Varsha Bollamma as Poorni
 Adesh Bala
 Viji Chandrasekhar as Marudhu's mother
 Kayal Vincent
 Mahendran
 Nellai Siva as Police officer

Production 
The film was shot for 45 days around Pattukkottai, two months before Cyclone Gaja took place. Varsha Bollamma was trained to use a southern Tamil Nadu accent for the film.

Soundtrack
Soundtrack was composed by Jose Franklin.
"Thanjavur Melathukku" - Velmurugan
"Aagayam Enna" - Shreya Ghoshal, Swetha Mohan, K.G. Ranjith
"Mudhal Murai" - Jose Franklin
"Karuvalan Kaattukku" - Sathyaprakash, Anitha Karthikeyan

Release 
The Times of India gave the film two out of five stars stating that "This rural romance, seems to be trying to another Kalavaani, but the a clichéd treatment works against it.". Cinema Express wrote "Seemathurai is a generic love story highlighted by its final act, an inconsequential hero and some effective performances".

References

External links 

2010s Tamil-language films
Indian romantic drama films
2018 romantic drama films
2018 directorial debut films